Sylvester Emeka Igbonu (born 8 September 1990), commonly known as Sylvester Igboun, is a Nigerian professional football player who plays as a forward.

Igboun is known for his blistering speed. His surname is Igbonu but was misspelled when registering a passport. His shirt lists his nickname "Sly" on the back instead of his last name.

Club career
On 13 July 2015, Igbonu signed for Russian Premier League side FC Ufa.

On 2 September 2019, he joined FC Dynamo Moscow on loan for the 2019–20 season. He was voted player of the month for September 2019 by Dynamo fans. On 4 August 2020, Dynamo Moscow announced that they had signed Igboun on a permanent transfer from FC Ufa. On 7 January 2022, his contract with Dynamo was terminated by mutual consent.

On 20 February 2022, Igboun joined Russian Premier League club Nizhny Novgorod until the end of the season. On 16 March 2022, the contract was terminated by mutual consent.

In September 2022, Igboun signed a two-year contract with Indian Super League club NorthEast United. On 20 October, he made his debut for the club against East Bengal, coming on as a 71st-minute substitute for Michael Jakobsen. The match ended in a 3–1 defeat. Three days later, Igboun left due to the poor facilities and accommodations provided by the team.

International career
He made his international debut in a 2017 Africa Cup of Nations qualification game against Tanzania on 5 September 2015, replacing Moses Simon as a substitute in the 69th minute.

Career statistics

Club

International

Statistics accurate as of match played 17 November 2015

Honours
Midtjylland
Danish Superliga: 2014–15

References

External links
 FC Midtjylland profile
 Career statistics at Danmarks Radio
 

1990 births
Living people
Nigerian footballers
Nigeria international footballers
Association football midfielders
F.C. Ebedei players
FC Midtjylland players
FC Ufa players
FC Dynamo Moscow players
FC Nizhny Novgorod (2015) players
Danish Superliga players
Russian Premier League players
Nigerian expatriate footballers
Expatriate men's footballers in Denmark
Nigerian expatriate sportspeople in Denmark
Expatriate footballers in Russia
Nigerian expatriate sportspeople in Russia